Dothidasteromella is a genus of fungi in the Asterinaceae family. The relationship of this taxon to other taxa within the class is unknown (incertae sedis), and it has not yet been placed with certainty into any order.

Species
Dothidasteromella acokantherae
Dothidasteromella brevilobi
Dothidasteromella evanescens
Dothidasteromella floridana
Dothidasteromella hansfordii
Dothidasteromella magnoliae
Dothidasteromella pandani
Dothidasteromella parvispora
Dothidasteromella pavettae
Dothidasteromella sepulta
Dothidasteromella systema-solare

References

Asterinaceae
Dothideomycetes genera
Taxa described in 1910
Taxa named by Franz Xaver Rudolf von Höhnel